Ashfield railway station is located on the Main Suburban line, serving the suburb of Ashfield, in Sydney, Australia. It is served by Sydney Trains T2 Inner West & Leppington line services.

History

Ashfield station opened on 26 September 1855 as part of the original Sydney to Parramatta line.

In 2002, the station was largely rebuilt with a new concrete aerial concourse and most of the platform buildings were demolished. Before completion of those facilities, the platforms were accessed from two pedestrian subways which incorporated separate booking offices. The western subway remains as a pedestrian thoroughfare.

In May 2018 Ashfield became the first station in New South Wales to have the OpalPay Park & Ride facility installed.

Platforms and services
The station has five platforms (two city bound, two outward bound, and one used as a turnback to the city).

Transport links

Transit Systems operate three routes via Ashfield station:
406: Five Dock to Hurlstone Park
464: to Mortlake via Croydon Park, Burwood and Concord
491: Five Dock to Hurstville via Canterbury

Ashfield station is served by three NightRide routes:
N50: Liverpool station to Town Hall station
N60: Fairfield station to Town Hall station
N61: Carlingford station to Town Hall station

Trackplan

References

External links

Ashfield station details Transport for New South Wales
Ashfield Station Public Transport Map Transport for NSW

Easy Access railway stations in Sydney
Railway stations in Sydney
Railway stations in Australia opened in 1855
Main Suburban railway line
Ashfield, New South Wales